The Ven Henry Wager Griffith, (23 July 1850 – 3 May 1932) was Archdeacon of Lahore from 1900 to 1905.

He was educated at The Queen's College, Oxford, and ordained in 1877. He held Curacies in Ramsgate, and Kennington. In 1881 he went to India as a Chaplain, serving at Umballa, Delhi, Karachi, Rawalpindi, Peshawar, Murree and Amritsar before his years as Archdeacon. On his return from Lahore he was appointed Vicar of All Saints, Thorp Arch, West Yorkshire.

Notes

1850 births
1932 deaths
Alumni of The Queen's College, Oxford
Christianity in Lahore
Archdeacons of Lahore